is a Japanese former cyclist. She competed in the women's road race event at the 1984 Summer Olympics and 1990 Asian Games.

References

External links
 

1966 births
Living people
Japanese female cyclists
Olympic cyclists of Japan
Cyclists at the 1984 Summer Olympics
Sportspeople from Fukushima Prefecture
Asian Games medalists in cycling
Cyclists at the 1990 Asian Games
Medalists at the 1990 Asian Games
Asian Games bronze medalists for Japan
People from Aizuwakamatsu
20th-century Japanese women
21st-century Japanese women